Sonal Kalra is an Indian journalist-author, presently with the Hindustan Times, India's second largest national English daily.

Career
Kalra, as Managing Editor of HT, heads Entertainment, Art and Lifestyle for 28 nationwide editions of the publication's daily supplements HT City in New Delhi and HT Cafe in Mumbai and Pune. Winner of the most prestigious journalism award in India - The Ramnath Goenka Award - Sonal Kalra also writes an extremely popular weekly column A Calmer You in HT City, which is being published since 2008, and has turned into three bestseller books - A Calmer You, More of a Calmer You, and Some More of a Calmer You. A features-writer and journalist, Kalra has previously edited a tech magazine and contributed to lifestyle publications on decor, health, wellness, fashion, food, beauty & fitness and travel, apart from serving as the content lead for Government of India web Portals under Ministry of Information Technology for over a decade.

She is the author of the books A Calmer You, More of a Calmer You and Some More of a Calmer You (Wisdom Tree Publishers) which are based on her column and gives witty tips to beat everyday stress in life. The books have been rated among the best seller self-help books in top bookstores across the Indian metros. 
She is the co-author of another book E-Government Toolkit for Developing Countries published by the United Nations. A paper authored by her on India.gov.in: India's answer to single entry portals was presented and published at the International Conference on Digital Government Research 2008, Montreal, Canada.

Awards and achievements

Kalra is a gold medallist from the renowned Indian Institute of Mass Communication, New Delhi and recipient of many prestigious awards including the Ramnath Goenka award as Best Film Journalist, Dr APJ Abdul Kalam Award for contribution to journalism, United Nations Cultural Relations Media Award 2015, Excellence in Journalism award 2010 and 2012 by International think tank GPS (the other recipients of the award included veteran journalists Khushwant Singh and HK Dua. She also received the Media Leader of the Decade - Features award 2016 where the co-recipients included noted Indian journalists Shekhar Gupta and Prabhu Chawla. Kalra's other honours include the Luxury League Award, Public Relations Society of India award, Best Content award for National Portal by Government of India 2005 and Manthan Award for exemplary content practices 2007.

In September 2011, she was awarded the prestigious Dr Sarvapalli Radhakrishnan Rashtriya Samman 2011 for
contribution to media. She also received the Young Achievers Award 2011 for excellence in media by the noted communications academy Whistling Woods International.

In January 2012, Sonal Kalra was conferred the Ramnath Goenka Award for Excellence in Film Journalism. The prestigious award is the highest honour for journalists in India and includes a citation and Rs 100,000 as prize money. The award was presented by the Hon'ble Vice President of India at a special ceremony attended by several cabinet ministers, senior journalists and eminent people, in Delhi, on 16 January 2012.

Her notable works include the HT Power Couples series where she interviewed the five most powerful couples of Indian film industry for the first time ever in their homes. The couples included Amitabh Bachchan and Jaya Bachchan, Akshay Kumar and Twinkle Khanna, Shah Rukh Khan and Gauri Khan, Saif Ali Khan and Kareena Kapoor and Abhishek Bachchan and Aishwarya Rai.

Kalra received the 'Outstanding contribution to Journalism' award 2009 from the WPO, an International non-political body, for the above series.
In April 2019, she was conferred the Media Achiever of the Year award from FICCI YFLO, a constituent of the Federation of Indian Chambers of Commerce and Industry

References

External links
 Sonal Kalra unofficial website
 Sonal Kalra's unofficial website by Sintivity Studio
 

Indian women journalists
Indian newspaper editors
Indian women newspaper editors
Living people
Indian columnists
Journalists from Delhi
Indian women columnists
Hindustan Times journalists
Year of birth missing (living people)